Sir John Evelyn Beringer  (born 14 February 1944) is a British microbiologist and Emeritus Professor at the University of Bristol.

He was educated at the University of Edinburgh (BSc, 1970) and the University of East Anglia (PhD, 1973). He was Professor of Molecular Genetics at the University of Bristol from 1984–2005, and Pro-Vice-Chancellor from 2001–2005. He was made a Commander of the Order of the British Empire (CBE) in 1993 and was knighted in 2000.

He lives near Bristol with his wife Sheila and has three sons, David, Richard and Peter.

References

1944 births
Living people
Alumni of the University of Edinburgh
Alumni of the University of East Anglia
Academics of the University of Bristol
Commanders of the Order of the British Empire
Knights Bachelor
British microbiologists